South Dakota Highway 247 (SD 247) is a short state highway running from Roscoe to an intersection with SD 10 and SD 45 east of Eureka. The route is just more than 23 miles in length.

Route description
SD 247 begins at the corner of Mitchell Street and Merrill Avenue in Roscoe. The route begins north from this intersection and leaves Roscoe, passing by a cemetery about a mile north of the city. Nine miles north of the cemetery, at the Edmunds–McPherson county line, SD 247 curves northwest. After heading in this direction for about half of a mile, the highway curves north again. Two miles north of this curve, SD 247 passes by another cemetery. Four miles north of this cemetery, the route turns west for one mile. After turning back to the north, the highway continues for six miles before ending at an intersection with SD 10 and SD 45. Continuing north or turning east at this intersection directs one onto SD 45, while turning either east or west directs one onto SD 10.

Major intersections

References

247
Transportation in Edmunds County, South Dakota
Transportation in McPherson County, South Dakota